Massachusetts House of Representatives' 4th Bristol district in the United States is one of 160 legislative districts included in the lower house of the Massachusetts General Court. It covers part of Bristol County. Republican Steven Howitt of Seekonk has represented the district since 2011.

Towns represented
The district includes the following localities:
 part of Norton
 Rehoboth
 Seekonk
 part of Swansea

The current district geographic boundary overlaps with those of the Massachusetts Senate's 1st Bristol and Plymouth and Bristol and Norfolk districts.

Former locales
The district previously covered Taunton, circa 1872.

Representatives
 Charles Foster, circa 1858 
 Marcus Morton, circa 1858 
 Harrison Tweed, circa 1858 
 Elisha Copeland, circa 1859 
 Henry H. Fox, circa 1859 
 Henry Sproat, circa 1859 
 Arthur G. Rounseville, circa 1888 
 Joseph E. Warner, circa 1920 
 Peter B. Gay, circa 1951 
 Ronald Anthony Pina, circa 1975 
 Antone S. Aguiar Jr., 1979–1982
 Philip Travis, 1983–2007
 Steven D'Amico, 2007–2011
 Steven S. Howitt, 2011-current

See also
 List of Massachusetts House of Representatives elections
 Other Bristol County districts of the Massachusetts House of Representatives: 1st, 2nd, 3rd, 5th, 6th, 7th, 8th, 9th, 10th, 11th, 12th, 13th, 14th
 List of Massachusetts General Courts
 List of former districts of the Massachusetts House of Representatives

Images

References

External links
 Ballotpedia
  (State House district information based on U.S. Census Bureau's American Community Survey).

House
Government of Bristol County, Massachusetts